Hva skal vi gjøre i dag og andre noveller (lit. What Shall We Do Today and Other Short Stories) is a 1996 short story collection by Norwegian author Øystein Lønn. It won the Nordic Council's Literature Prize in 1996.

References

1996 short story collections
Norwegian short story collections
Nordic Council's Literature Prize-winning works